Nicholas Whale (born 4 March 1963) is a British racing driver. He currently competes in historic rallying and FIA historic saloon racing events. He runs Silverstone Auctions, Classic Car Auctions, Automotive Auctions and Nick Whale Motorhomes. He was a main board director of both the BRDC and the MSA and also a trustee and a Director of the Midlands Air Ambulance.

Career
He started his racing career in 1980 by hillclimbing and sprinting a Mallock U2 and progressed to saloon car track racing in 1986. In 1988 he won his class at the Willhire 24 Hour race. In 1989 Whale won the Uniroyal British Production Saloon Championship (class B) in a BMW M3. For 1990 he stepped up to the British Touring Car Championship as teammate to Godfrey Hall and John Clark driving for Pyramid Motorsport in a BMW M3, finishing the year in 17th place overall. He returned for a second season in 1991 for Tech-Speed Motorsport as teammate to Nick Baird and later in the season, Matt Neal. He then went on to race in Thundersaloons in a Toyota Supra and Vauxhall Calibra, and British GT's in a variety of Porsches, until retiring from modern motorsport in 1996.
 
He then ran the 'Works' TVR team for the factory in British GT's and FIA European events for the '97 and '98 season with Mark Hales and Phil Andrews driving. He then returned to driving again in both the GT Cup and in historic motorsport.

In 1999 he took up historic rallying and became the '99 Safety Devices Historic Champion and in 2000 became the first MSA British Historic Rally Champion in a '73 Porsche 911 RS ~ both with Nick Kennedy as co-driver.
 
Since then he has raced in FIA historic saloons throughout Europe, GT's and Sports cars, as well as Can-Am sportscars all over the world. He won the St. Mary's Trophy in a Ford Mustang at the Goodwood Revival in 2000 (finishing 2nd in 2007 in a Mercury Comet Cyclone) and has finished in the top 6 of the Goodwood TT in a steel bodied E-Type (CUT 7) and 2nd in the Whitsun Trophy in a Mclaren M1B several times.
In more recent times he has raced his original ex BTCC BMW M3 with his son Harry and is now rallying a Mk II Ford escort in the MSV/Motorsport News tarmac rally series, as well as an original FIA Ford Escort MkI RS1600 on the International historic racing scene.

Racing record

Complete British Touring Car Championship results
(key) Races in bold indicate pole position (1982-1984 in class) Races in italics indicate fastest lap.

† Race was stopped early due to heavy rain, and no points were awarded.

24 Hours of Silverstone results

References

External links

Nick Whale at BTCC

1963 births
Living people
British Touring Car Championship drivers
Porsche Carrera Cup GB drivers
Britcar 24-hour drivers